This article lists diplomatic missions resident in Monaco.  At present, the Principality hosts three embassies. Some countries, while accrediting an ambassador from Paris, conduct day-to-day relations and provide consular services from consulates-general in nearby French cities, such as Marseille or Nice, or employ Honorary Consuls.

Embassies 
La Rousse/Saint Roman

Monte Carlo

Honorary Consulates
Fontvieille

La Colle

La Condamine

Larvotto

Les Révoires

Moneghetti

Monaco-Ville

Monte Carlo

 

 

Saint Michel

La Rousse/Saint Roman

Non-resident embassies 
Resident in Paris unless otherwise stated.

 

 

 (London)

 (London)

 (Geneva)

 (Brussels)

 (Brussels)

 (Brussels)

 (Brussels)

 (Berlin)

 (Brussels)

 (Brussels)

 (Valletta)

 (San Marino)

See also 
 Foreign relations of Monaco

Notes

References 

 Monaco Diplomatic List

Diplomatic missions in
Monaco
Diplomatic missions
Diplomatic missions